Master of the Game may refer to:

 Master of the Game (novel), a 1982 novel by Sidney Sheldon
 Master of the Game (James "J.T." Taylor album), 1989
 Master of the Game (George Duke album), 1979

See also
 The Master of Game, medieval hunting treatise
 Gamemaster,